Matador Records is an independent record label, with a roster of mainly indie rock, but also punk rock, experimental rock, alternative rock, and electronic acts.

History
Matador was created in 1989 by Chris Lombardi in his New York City apartment. Lombardi had brought the Austrian duo H.P. Zinker into Wharton Tiers’ Fun City studio to record Matador's first release, "...and there was light". Lombardi continued to add artists to the label's roster, with bands like the Dustdevils, Railroad Jerk and Superchunk, before being joined by former Homestead Records manager Gerard Cosloy in 1990.

Lombardi and Cosloy have continued to run Matador Records together with Patrick Amory coming on as Matador's label manager in 1994, later becoming label president as well as a partner of Lombardi and Cosloy. Matador first drew mainstream media attention and larger sales with the North American release of Teenage Fanclub’s debut record, A Catholic Education in 1990. Other early releases that bolstered the label included Pavement's debut studio album Slanted and Enchanted in 1992 and Liz Phair's debut album, Exile in Guyville in 1993.

1993 also saw Matador enter into a partnership with Atlantic Records which lasted for several years. In 1996, Capitol Records purchased a 49 percent stake in Matador, which Lombardi and Cosloy bought back in 1999. Beggars Group purchased 50% of Matador in 2002 and took over the label's worldwide marketing.

Over the years, the label has moved to larger and larger premises, and it now operates in both London and New York. Matador Europe supervises the promotion, sales and marketing of Matador titles in Europe. The London-based office has also licensed recordings from some North American artists, such as M. Ward, Sleater-Kinney, Modest Mouse, and Superchunk. The roster has grown with the label, and Matador has helped artists such as Yo La Tengo, Cat Power, Cornelius, Solex, Pizzicato Five, Helium and the Arsonists reach audiences worldwide.

In the early 2000s, Matador had to sidestep unwanted involvement in the Recording Industry Association of America dispute over peer-to-peer file sharing networks. Matador's Patrick Amory contacted the RIAA multiple times in order to ensure that an erroneous listing on the group's website of Matador as an RIAA member was removed. After several attempts, the name of the independent label was removed from the membership list. Despite Matador's removal from the RIAA list, four of the label's albums have been certified Gold for sales of at least 500,000 units by the association: Exile in Guyville and Whip-Smart by Liz Phair and Turn on the Bright Lights and Antics by Interpol.

Matador acquired True Panther Sounds as an imprint in 2009. Cosloy, speaking through the Matador blog, stated that True Panther Sounds "will continue to be managed by label founder Dean Bein." And that the reason Matador acquired True Panther Sounds was simply, "As Victor Kiam once explained his decision to purchase the Remington Shaver operation, “I liked it so much, I bought the company.” The first joint venture by the two labels was Girls’ debut critically acclaimed release ‘Album’ and was "worked through Matador’s fearsome promotional & marketing machinery."

In October 2010, Matador celebrated the label's 21st anniversary with a series of concerts at the Palms Hotel & Casino in Las Vegas. Pavement, Yo La Tengo, the New Pornographers, Spoon, Ted Leo & the Pharmacists, Guided By Voices, Kurt Vile, Cold Cave, Fucked Up, Liz Phair, Shearwater, Superchunk, Come, Times New Viking, Belle & Sebastian, Cat Power, Chavez, Perfume Genius, Harlem, and Guitar Wolf were amongst the participants. During the event Many of the artists stated their opinions and admiration of Matador. Damian Abraham, of Fucked Up, said that not only did Matador give them credibility as a band but also, "There were a lot of people who thought of us as that band with the swear word that yells, but Matador signing us was like, 'No, no, no, it's okay -- give it a second look.' We fell ass-backwards into being on one of the top indie labels of all time." Mike Hadreas said, "To me, signing to Matador was like getting into a really good school." 'It's a hard thing to talk about without resorting to clichés, but Matador really loves music,' said Ira Kaplan of Yo La Tengo.

Matador has continued to sign bands of various genres including Iceage, Lower, Algiers, Majical Cloudz, Car Seat Headrest and Snail Mail.

Current artists

 Algiers
 Belle and Sebastian
 Body/Head
 Car Seat Headrest (with associated acts 1 Trait Danger and Skinny Teeth)
 Circuit Des Yeux
 Darkside
  Gang of Four
  Horsegirl
 Interpol

 Julien Baker
 Kim Gordon
 King Krule
 Lifeguard
 Lucy Dacus
 Mdou Moctar
 Muzz
 Pavement
 Perfume Genius

 Queens of the Stone Age
 Savages
 Snail Mail
 Spoon
 Stephen Malkmus and the Jicks
 Steve Gunn
 The Desert Sessions
 Yo La Tengo

Past artists

 18th Dye
 2 Foot Flame
 A. C. Newman
 Aereogramme
 Arab Strap
 Arsonists
 Babylon Dance Band
 Bailter Space
 Barbara Manning
 Bardo Pond
 Bassholes
 Bettie Serveert
 Boards of Canada
 Brightblack Morning Light
 Bullet LaVolta
 Bunnybrains
 burger/ink
 Cat Power
 Ceremony
 Chain Gang
 Chavez
 Chelsea Light Moving
 Chris Knox
 Circle X
 Cold Cave
 Come
 Condo Fucks
 Console
 Cornelius
 Couch
 D-Story
 Dälek
 Dave Schramm
 David Kilgour
 Dead Meadow
 Demolition Doll Rods
 Dizzee Rascal
 Dustdevils
 Earles and Jensen
 Early Man
 Erika M. Anderson
 Esben and the Witch
 Fire In The Kitchen
 Flipper
 Fuck
 God Help the Girl
 Graeme Downes
 Guided by Voices
 Guitar Wolf

 Harlem
 H.P. Zinker
 Helium
 Jad Fair & Yo La Tengo
 Jaguar Love
 Jay Reatard
 Jega
 Jennifer O'Connor
 Jimi Tenor
 Jon Spencer Blues Explosion
 Julian Plenti
 Khan
 Kurt Vile
 Kustomized
 Large Professor
 Laura Cantrell
 Lavender Diamond
 Lemonade
 Lesser
 Liquor Giants
 Live Human
 Liz Phair
 Lower
 Lou Reed
 Love Of Diagrams
 Lynnfield Pioneers
 Lyres
 M. Ward
 Magic Kids
 Majical Cloudz
 Mark Eitzel
 Mary Timony
 Matmos
 MC Paul Barman
 Mecca Normal 
 Mission of Burma
 Modest Mouse
 Mogwai
 Moonshake
 Mount Florida
 Mr. Len
 Neko Case
 Nightmares On Wax
 Non Phixion
 Pell Mell
 Pitchblende
 Pizzicato Five
 Plone
 Pole
 Portastatic

 Preston School of Industry
 Pretty Girls Make Graves
 Prisonshake
 Prosaics
 Quickspace
 Railroad Jerk
 Red Snapper
 Robert Pollard
 Run On
 Sad Rockets
 Sensational
 SF Seals
 Shams
 Shearwater

 Silkworm
 Sleater-Kinney
 Smog
 Solex
 Sonic Youth
 Spiral Stairs
 Sportsguitar
 Superchunk
 Techno Animal
 Ted Leo and the Pharmacists
 Teenage Fanclub
 Thalia Zedek
 The Bionaut
 The Cave Singers
 The Clean
 The Double
 The Fall
 The For Carnation
 The Frogs
 The Fucking Champs
 The Modernist
 The Pastels
 The Ponys
 The Soft Boys
 The Wisdom of Harry
 The Young
 Thinking Fellers Union Local 282
 Times New Viking
 Tobin Sprout
 Toiling Midgets
 Tommy Keene
 Two Lone Swordsmen
 Unrest
 Unsane
 Unwound
 Void

See also 
 List of record labels

References

External links
 Matador Records official Web site

 
Record labels established in 1989
Indie rock record labels
Alternative rock record labels
American independent record labels
Beggars Group
Hip hop record labels
Electronic music record labels